Baik Island is an island located in the Celebes Sea near Lahad Datu area in Sabah, Malaysia.

See also
 List of islands of Malaysia

References

External links 
 Coral Reefs And Marine Benthic Habitat Mapping Using Hydroacoustics Methods (Baik Island)
 Baik Island Weather

Islands of Sabah